Arcadia Lost is a 2010 American drama film directed by Phedon Papamichael Jr. and starring Haley Bennett, Carter Jenkins, and Nick Nolte. The film both takes place and was filmed in Greece. Specifically it was filmed in the village Poulithra, in the municipal unit of Leonidio, in the municipality of South Kynouria, in the regional unit of Arcadia.

Poulithra is a traditional settlement. It is one of the last remaining tranquil, coastal villages with traditional stone houses.

Plot
After a car accident, two teenagers are left stranded in rural Greece. Charlotte has a deep desire to find connection, but hides behind a sullen disposition and her new-found sexual power. Sye, her recent stepbrother, is introverted, hiding behind his camera and caustic wit. As the two wander the dusty roads and staggering beauty of Greece, they come across Benerji, an expatriate American. With no other alternative, they reluctantly accept him as their guide.

The three begin an adventurous journey toward the mystic waters on the sacred Mount Parnonas. Their journey takes them through a landscape both ancient and modern. Events force them to confront the truth of their past and the frightening, beautiful reality of their present.

Cast
Nick Nolte as Benerji
Haley Bennett as Charlotte
Carter Jenkins as Sye
Dato Bakhtadze as Gorgo
Lachlan Buchanan as Raffi
Renos Haralambidis as hotel manager
Anthony Burk as cook
Alex Zorbas as Desmond
Alexandra Pavlidou as Alisa
David Ariniello as Charlotte's dad
James Ivory as wedding photographer
Nikolas Marmaras as waiter
Olga Kyprotou as woman in white
Anastasia Poutsela as old woman
Arietta Valmas as girl in white
Vassilis Drossos as truck driver

External links
 
 LA Greek Film Festival Review by Alex Lovering
 Little Rock Film Festival 2010: Lost on Another Island
 

2010 films
2010 drama films
American drama films
Arcadia, Peloponnese
2010s English-language films
Films scored by Michael Brook
Films set in Greece
Films shot in Greece
Films directed by Phedon Papamichael
2010s American films